James Duthie may refer to:

 James Duthie (field hockey) (born 1957), British former field hockey player
 James Duthie (sportscaster) (born 1966), Canadian sportscaster
 Jim Duthie (1923–1972), Scottish footballer (Southend United)
 James Duthie (rugby union), 1903 English rugby union international